The Hia C-eḍ Oʼodham ("Sand Dune People"), also known as Areneños or Sand Papagos are a Native American peoples whose traditional homeland lies between the Ajo Range, the Gila River, the Colorado River, and the Gulf of California. They are currently unrecognized at both the state and federal level in the United States and Mexico, although the Tohono Oʼodham Nation has a committee for issues related to them and has land held in trust for them. They are represented by a community organization known as the Hia-Ced Oʼodham Alliance. The Hia C-eḍ Oʼodham are no longer nomadic, and the majority today live in or near Ajo, Arizona, or the small settlements of Blaisdell and Dome near Yuma.

They have often been considered a "Papago subtribe" by anthropologists, along with the Tohono Oʼodham and several groups that vanished or merged with the Tohono Oʼodham. Anybody who can prove Hia C-eḍ Oʼodham ancestry meeting Tohono Oʼodham Nation blood quantum can apply for membership in the Tohono Oʼodham Nation. Some Hia Ced Oʼodham people are enrolled in the Ak-Chin Indian Community.

On February 24, 2009, 642.27 acres of land near Why, Arizona, which were previously purchased by the Tohono Oʼodham Nation, were acquired in trust for the Nation. This was done with the intention of eventually creating a new district of the Tohono Oʼodham Nation for the Hia C-eḍ Oʼodham. On October 30, 2012, a new tribal law went into effect creating the "Hia Ced District" as a new 12th district of the Tohono Oʼodham nation, with the trust land near Why as its initial land base. For three years after the effective date, previously enrolled members of the Tohono Oʼodham Nation had the right to request that their district designation be reassigned to the new district. People applying for tribal enrollment could also request the Hia Ced District as their district designation. Following controversy over its management and expenditures, the new district was dissolved in accordance with an initiative approved by voters of the Tohono Oʼodham Nation on April 25, 2015. Property and funds of the Hia Ced District reverted to the Nation, and members' enrollment reverted to their previous district.

In December 2015, former leaders of the Hia Ced District announced the formation of an organization called Hia-Ced Hemajkam, LLC, whose goal would be to seek federal recognition of the Hia-Ced Oʼodham as a distinct Indian tribe.

Oʼodham people

Culture 
Due to geographical proximity, certain cultural traits were borrowed from the Yuman peoples, with some sources implying that their culture was more Yuman than it was Piman, with the exception of their language. According to historical sources, the Hia C-eḍ Oʼodham were friendly with the Cocopah, the Quechan, and the Halchidhoma.

Cuisine 
The Hia C-eḍ Oʼodham were traditionally hunters and gatherers. They caught jackrabbits by chasing them down in the sand. They hunted mountain sheep, mule deer, and pronghorn with bows and arrows. They caught muskrats and lizards as well. During certain seasons, they went to the gulf to fish and obtain salt.

They also ate Pholisma sonorae, an edible flower stalk called camote and "sand food" found in the sand dunes, mesquite beans, saguaro fruit, and pitaya, which they gathered near Quitobaquito and the Lower Sonoita River.

See also 
 El Camino del Diablo

Notes

References 
 Oral and Documentary Report for the Hia C-ed Oʼodham Alliance and Native Lands Institute February 1997 Draft
 Griffin-Pierce, Trudy. 2000. Native Peoples of the Southwest. University of New Mexico Press, Albuquerque, New Mexico, USA.

External links
 Hia-Ced Hemajkam, LLC – group with the mission of preserving Hia-Ced Oʼodham culture and seeking federal recognition as a tribe

Tohono O'odham
Native American tribes in Arizona
Indigenous peoples of Aridoamerica
Gila River